This is a list of geopolitical entities, geographical features, localities, and other places in Canada with names that originate from the Spanish language.

Table

See also
 List of place names in Canada of aboriginal origin
 List of U.S. place names of Spanish origin
 Locations in Canada with an English name
 Scottish place names in Canada
 List of Scottish Gaelic place names in Canada
 List of Canadian place names of Ukrainian origin
 Labrador, a region in Canada whose name is of Portuguese origin

References

Spanish
place names
Spanish
Spanish language in North America